Afira bint 'Abbad ( Ashshamus) was an Arab poet from around the 3rd century CE.

Anthologies
Moris Farhi (ed) Classical Poems by Arab Women translated Abdullah al-Udhari, Saqi Books, 1999.

References

3rd-century Arabs
Arabic-language women poets
Arabic-language poets
Pre-Islamic Arabian poets
3rd-century women writers